Robert Storer may refer to:

 Robert Vivian Storer (1900–1958), Australian venereologist, sex educator, and writer
 Robert W. Storer (1914–2008), American ornithologist
 Robert Treat Paine Storer (1893–1962), American football player for Harvard University